The Legend of God's Gun is a 2007 American independent Western film celebrating the tradition of Western films and the spirit of Rock and Roll. The film is actually based on the psychedelic Western album of the same name by the band Spindrift—the album having preceded the production of the film by a number of years.

Plot
A gun-slinging preacher returns to the debaucherous town of Playa Diablo seeking revenge from the notorious scorpion-venom drinking bandito El Sobero, a descendant of a disciple of King Tavatta—the Scorpion King from the ancient world. El Sobero and his band of bad banditos are also returning to Playa Diablo seeking their own revenge against the town sheriff for putting a bounty on their heads and subsequently shooting all of their horses. With the Bounty Hunter dragging up slowly behind there is sure to be a confrontation of Biblical proportions as they all meet in the circle of death. This is The Legend Of God's Gun.

Shooting locations
 Death Valley
 Pioneertown, California
 Hollywood Hills

References

External links

Indican Pictures
Official Myspace Film Profile

2007 films
American independent films
2007 Western (genre) films
American Western (genre) films
2000s English-language films
2000s American films